Hydrology and Earth System Sciences (HESS) is a monthly  peer reviewed open access scientific journal that publishes original research in hydrology and related field like water resource management. The journal is published by Copernicus Publications on behalf of the European Geosciences Union. The journal was established in 1997 and is edited by Erwin Zehe (Karlsruhe Institute of Technology).

Indexing and abstracting
According to the Journal Citation Reports, the journal has a 2020 impact factor of 5.748. The journal is indexing in the following bibliographic databases:

References

External links

Publications established in 1997
Open access journals
Monthly journals
Copernicus Publications academic journals
European Geosciences Union academic journals